Furesø could refer to:

 Furesø municipality, Denmark
 Furesø (lake), Denmark